Konrad Hermann Theodor Knopp (22 July 1882 – 20 April 1957) was a German mathematician who worked on generalized limits and complex functions.

Family and education
Knopp was born in 1882 in Berlin to Paul Knopp (1845–1904), a businessman in manufacturing, and Helene (1857–1923), née Ostertun, whose own father was a butcher.  Paul's hometown of Neustettin, then part of Germany, became Polish territory after the Second World War and is now called Szczecinek. In 1910, Konrad married the painter Gertrud Kressner (1879 - 1974). They had a daughter Ortrud Knopp (1911 - 1976), with the grandchildren Willfried Spohn (1944 - 2012), Herbert Spohn (*1946) und Wolfgang Spohn (*1950), and a son Ingolf Knopp (1915 – 2008), with the grandchildren Brigitte Knopp (*1952) and Werner Knopp (*1954).

Konrad was primarily educated in Berlin, with a brief sojourn at the University of Lausanne in 1901 for a single semester, before settling at the University of Berlin, where he remained for his doctoral studies.  His doctoral thesis, entitled Grenzwerte von Reihen bei der Annäherung an die Konvergenzgrenze, was supervised by Schottky and Frobenius; he received his PhD in 1907.

Travels, teaching, and military career
Knopp traveled widely in Asia, taking teaching jobs in Nagasaki, Japan (1908-9), at the commercial college, and in Qingdao, China (1910–11), at the German-Chinese college there, and spending some time in India and China following his stay in Japan.  His wedding to Kressner, the daughter of Colonel Karl Kressner and Hedwig Rebling, took place in Germany between these periods.  After Qingdao he returned to Germany for good and taught at military academies while writing his habilitation thesis for Berlin University.

During the First World War he was an officer and was wounded at the beginning of the war, which resulted in his discharge from the army; by the autumn of 1914 he was teaching at Berlin University. In the following year he was appointed as an extraordinary professor at the University of Königsberg, becoming an ordinary professor there in 1919.  In 1926 he accepted a professorship at University of Tübingen as the chair of mathematics, and remained there until his retirement in 1950.

Publications and editions

Articles
Selected articles of Knopp include:
 
 
 
 
 
 

In 1918, Knopp was one of the co-founders of the journal Mathematische Zeitschrift (in which the majority of his above-cited articles are published).  He was the editor of the journal from 1934 to 1952.

After retirement Knopp continued to do mathematics, publishing for example
 
and delivering the lecture Folgenräume und Limitierungsverfahren at the first meeting of the International Mathematics Union in 1952.

Books
Knopp's mathematical research was on "generalized limits" and he wrote two books on sequences and series:
 
 

He also authored two texts on functions of a complex variable as well as a problem book:
 
 
 

He also produced the sixth edition of the three-volume work (a fourth volume was later added by Friedrich Lösch in 1980):

See also
Osgood curve
Riemann zeta function

References
The following works were used as sources for the MacTutor biography on which this article was originally based:

External links 

 
 

1882 births
1957 deaths
20th-century German mathematicians
German Army personnel of World War I
Complex analysts
Mathematical analysts
Scientists from Berlin
Humboldt University of Berlin alumni
Academic staff of the University of Königsberg
Academic staff of the University of Tübingen